Louisiana Highway 140 (LA 140) is a state highway located in Morehouse Parish, Louisiana.  It runs  in an east–west direction from U.S. Highway 425 (US 425) in Log Cabin to a junction with U.S. Highway 165 (US 165) and LA 599 in Bonita.

The route provides the most direct connection between Bastrop, the parish seat, and northbound US 165, which heads north from Bonita toward the Arkansas state line.  US 165 takes a more indirect routing, heading eastward out of Bastrop before turning north at Mer Rouge.  Providing both a north–south and an east–west function, the signage for LA 140 does not carry directional banners.  The route is known locally as Old Bonita Road.

Route description
It proceeds northeast along Old Bonita Road, and the area gradually becomes sparsely populated over the next several miles. After making a brief curve to the north, LA 140 intersects LA 591 (Old Berlin Highway) at a point known as Twin Oaks. LA 591 heads north along Bayou Bartholomew toward the Arkansas state line.

Soon after resuming its northeastern course, the surroundings abruptly change from thick forest to open farmland.  LA 140 curves due east briefly and intersects LA 599 (Sisson Highway), which makes a long semi-circle before meeting LA 140 again at its final destination of Bonita.  LA 140 then curves back to the northeast and  later, it intersects LA 833 (Jones Cutoff Road).  LA 140 turns due east while LA 833 heads northeast to US 165 at Jones, bypassing Bonita.

LA 140 then curves southeast into the small village of Bonita.  At Railroad Street, the highway makes a sharp turn to the south to cross the Union Pacific Railroad (UPRR) tracks at grade.  LA 140 ends shortly afterward at US 165 (Bonita Avenue) opposite a second intersection with LA 599 (Rosenwald Road).  US 165 heads northeast toward the Arkansas state line and the city of Wilmot, Arkansas.

LA 140 is classified as a rural major collector by the Louisiana Department of Transportation and Development (La DOTD). Average daily traffic volume in 2013 is reported as 3,800 vehicles between the western terminus and Twin Oaks, decreasing to 810 to the junction with LA 833, and again to 260 from there to the eastern terminus.

History

Pre-1955 route numbering

In the original Louisiana Highway system in use between 1921 and 1955, the modern LA 140 was part of three consecutively numbered routes: State Route C-1484, State Route C-1485, and State Route C-1486.  All three were designated during the early 1930s by the state highway department.  Route C-1484 followed the current route of LA 140 from the western terminus at Log Cabin to the present junction with LA 591, where it turned northward and headed to the Arkansas state line.  Route C-1485 picked up the route to the present junction with LA 833, where it continued ahead to the northeast toward Jones.

The remainder of the modern LA 140 from LA 833 to US 165 at Bonita was originally designated as State Route C-1486.  Like the previous two routes, it was created in the early 1930s by the state highway department.  (State highways in the pre-1955 system ceased to be designated by acts of the state legislature after 1930 and began to carry a "C-" prefix.)  All three routes remained the same up to the 1955 Louisiana Highway renumbering.

Post-1955 route history
LA 140 was created in the 1955 renumbering from the above described parts of former State Routes C-1484 and C-1485 as well as the entirety of former State Route C-1486.

The route has remained the same to the present day.  However, the western terminus at Log Cabin was originally a junction with LA 139.  US 425 was established in 1989 following the existing route of LA 139 from the Arkansas state line south to Bastrop.  The designation of LA 139 was then replaced by US 425, which became the new western terminus of LA 140.  In addition, LA 140 has been slightly realigned at its western terminus to intersect US 425 at a right-angle.  This was done in conjunction with a project completed in April 2012 that widened US 425 to four lanes north of Bastrop.

Major intersections

See also

References

External links

Maps / GIS Data Homepage, Louisiana Department of Transportation and Development

0140
Transportation in Morehouse Parish, Louisiana